Hassan Risheh is the Ambassador Extraordinary and Plenipotentiary of the Syrian Arab Republic to the Russian Federation.

See also 
 Ambassador of Syria to Russia

References 

Year of birth missing (living people)
Living people
Ambassadors of Syria to Russia
Arab Socialist Ba'ath Party – Syria Region politicians